Pecan Acres is a census-designated place (CDP) in Tarrant and Wise counties in the U.S. state of Texas. The population was 4,099 at the 2010 census.

Geography
Pecan Acres is located at  (32.984557, -97.485341).

Demographics

2020 census

As of the 2020 United States census, there were 4,808 people, 1,320 households, and 1,193 families residing in the CDP.

2000 census
As of the census of 2000, there were 2,289 people, 832 households, and 655 families residing in the CDP. The population density was 118.0 people per square mile (45.5/km2). There were 920 housing units at an average density of 47.4/sq mi (18.3/km2). The racial makeup of the CDP was 95.33% White, 0.09% African American, 1.53% Native American, 1.70% from other races, and 1.35% from two or more races. Hispanic or Latino of any race were 4.41% of the population.

There were 832 households, out of which 38.6% had children under the age of 18 living with them, 64.9% were married couples living together, 9.7% had a female householder with no husband present, and 21.2% were non-families. 17.3% of all households were made up of individuals, and 6.5% had someone living alone who was 65 years of age or older. The average household size was 2.75 and the average family size was 3.10.

In the CDP, the population was spread out, with 28.1% under the age of 18, 6.7% from 18 to 24, 31.1% from 25 to 44, 23.0% from 45 to 64, and 11.1% who were 65 years of age or older. The median age was 37 years. For every 100 females, there were 98.9 males. For every 100 females age 18 and over, there were 98.1 males.

The median income for a household in the CDP was $43,167, and the median income for a family was $46,397. Males had a median income of $40,000 versus $25,053 for females. The per capita income for the CDP was $17,642. About 12.7% of families and 14.0% of the population were below the poverty line, including 21.6% of those under age 18 and 9.2% of those age 65 or over.

Education
Pecan Acres is served by the Northwest and Eagle Mountain-Saginaw Independent School Districts.

References

Dallas–Fort Worth metroplex
Census-designated places in Tarrant County, Texas
Census-designated places in Wise County, Texas
Census-designated places in Texas